Krishnakumar Balasubramanian is an Indian film and stage actor. He is the artistic director of The Little Theatre (India). He has scripted and directed many stage plays for The Little Theatre (India) namely the Christmas pantomimes 'Alice in iLand' in 2011 and 'The Free Musketeers' in 2012, 2 musicals 'Atita' in 2010 and 'Gapsaa - Fully Loaded' in 2012 for the 'Little Festival' - an international theatre festival for young audiences. He is considered to be one of the hardworking actor having years of experience.

He has acted in a short film directed by Ritesh Batra in October 2018

He was the theatre director of Kalakshetra Foundation's dance theatre production on the occasion of Mahatma Gandhi's 150th Birthday celebration ‘Shanthi Sutra’

Acted as Captain Chaitanya Rao ‘Che’ in the Suriya starrer ‘Soorarai Pottru’ released in November 2020.

Career

He played the lead role in the full-length feature film Kadhalagi with actor Prakash Raj. It was released in May 2010. The 26-year-old was also featured as one of the 37 Indians of tomorrow by ‘India Today’ in its 37th Anniversary issue with Ranbir Kapoor and Virat Kohli – December 2012.

He is a member of the Global Shapers community, an initiative of the World Economic Forum,(2012). He was a panellist at the World Economic Forum on India 2012 (South Asia's Children—Are We Thinking about South Asia's Tomorrow) with Sarah Brown (wife of ex Prime Minister, UK) and Ulhas Yargop  President, IT Sector, Mahindra & Mahindra, India.

Krishnakumar Balasubramanian also Known As KK, portrayed Captain Che(a)Chaitanya Rao in the film Soorarai Pottru, keeping the role in the Telugu dubbing as well.

He was announced to play a role in the upcoming Dhanush film directed by Karthick Naren.

Filmography

References

External links
Kadhalagi

Living people
Date of birth missing (living people)
Indian male film actors
Indian male stage actors
Indian art directors
Indian theatre directors
Indian male dramatists and playwrights
Year of birth missing (living people)